Events from the year 1745 in Great Britain.

Incumbents
 Monarch – George II
 Prime Minister – Henry Pelham (Whig)
 Parliament – 9th

Events
 30 April–11 May – War of the Austrian Succession: British forces defeated at the Battle of Fontenoy.
 16 June – King George's War: British capture Cape Breton Island in North America from the French.
 26 June – the earliest known women's cricket match, at Gosden Common in Surrey.
 9 July (20 July NS) – Jacobite rising: The Du Teillay, carrying the Young Pretender Charles Edward Stuart from France to Scotland, and her escort L'Elisabeth engage with HMS Lion in the English Channel.
 23 July – Jacobite rising: Charles Stuart lands on Eriskay in the Hebrides in Scotland.
 15–26 August – War of the Austrian Succession: By the Convention of Hanover, King George II makes peace overtures to Prussia and ends support for Austria.
 16 August – Jacobite rising: A Jacobite victory at Highbridge Skirmish. 
 19 August – Jacobite rising: Charles Stuart raises his standard at Glenfinnan.
 11 September – Jacobite rising: Jacobites enter Edinburgh.
 16 September – Jacobite rising: "Canter of Coltbrigg": The 13th and 14th Dragoons flee Jacobites near Edinburgh.
 17 September – Jacobite rising: in Edinburgh, Charles Stuart proclaims his father James Francis Edward Stuart as James VIII of Scotland.
 21 September – Jacobite rising: Government forces are defeated at the Battle of Prestonpans.
 28 September – the song later to become the British national anthem "God Save the King" is first performed at the Drury Lane Theatre in London in a setting by Thomas Arne.
 13–15 November – Jacobite rising: Jacobites besiege and capture Carlisle. 
 December – Jacobite rising: Jacobite garrison in Carlisle surrenders to Hanoverian forces under Prince William, Duke of Cumberland. 
 4 December – Jacobite rising: Jacobite forces reach Derby causing panic in London.
 6 December – Jacobite rising: Jacobite forces decide to retreat to Scotland.
 18 December – Jacobite rising: A Jacobite victory at the Clifton Moor Skirmish, the last action between two military forces on English soil.
 23 December – Jacobite rising: A Jacobite victory at the Battle of Inverurie.

Undated
 West towers of Westminster Abbey completed.
 The term "middle class" is first used.

Publications
 Henry Fielding edits the pro-government publication The True Patriot.

Births
 23 January – William Jessop, civil engineer (died 1814)
 February – Samuel Hearne, explorer, fur-trader, author and naturalist (died 1792)
 2 February
 Hannah More, religious writer, Romantic poet and philanthropist (died 1833)
 John Nichols, printer and antiquary (died 1826)
 14 February – Lady Sarah Lennox, courtier (died 1826)
 20 February – Henry James Pye, poet laureate (died 1813)
 4 March – Charles Dibdin, composer (died 1814)
 12 May – William Creech, Scottish bookseller and Lord Provost of Edinburgh (died 1815)
 13 July – Robert Calder, admiral (died 1818)
 20 July – Henry Holland, architect (died 1806)
 20 or 21 August – Francis Asbury, bishop of the Methodist Episcopal Church (died 1816 in the United States)
 17 October – William Scott, 1st Baron Stowell, judge and jurist (died 1836)
 7 November – Prince Henry, Duke of Cumberland and Strathearn, member of the royal family (died 1793)
 10 December – Thomas Holcroft, writer (died 1809)

Deaths
 26 February – Henry Scudamore, 3rd Duke of Beaufort (born 1707)
 18 March – Robert Walpole, first Prime Minister of Great Britain (born 1676)
 28 May – Jonathan Richardson, portrait painter, writer on art and collector (born 1667)
 30 September – Sir John Baird, 2nd Baronet, Scottish politician (born 1686)
 19 October – Jonathan Swift, Irish satirist (born 1667)
 16 November – James Butler, 2nd Duke of Ormonde, exiled Irish-born statesman and soldier (born 1665)
 John Freame, banker (born 1669)

References

 
Years in Great Britain